Tsuen Wan Public Library is located in Tsuen Wan, New Territories, Hong Kong. Opened in 1993, it is one of the major libraries of the Hong Kong Public Libraries system.

History
The original Tsuen Wan Public Library occupied the ground floor of Wing Hong House, Fuk Loi Estate, around 200 metres from the current library. This was the first public library in the New Territories. At the time, the Tsuen Wan and Kwai Chung area was growing rapidly under Hong Kong's new town development programme.

The current Tsuen Wan Public Library is part of a building complex that also includes the Tsuen Wan Government Offices. The HK$258-million contract to construct the complex was jointly signed by the Architectural Services Department and the contractor on 22 June 1990. The library was planned and managed by the public libraries service of the former Regional Council, and was the largest public library in Hong Kong when it opened. Originally known as the Tsuen Wan Central Library, the new facility was formally inaugurated on 23 July 1993 by Governor Chris Patten, who gave a speech calling libraries "one of the most important community services".

In 1997, the Tsuen Wan Central Library and Sha Tin Central Library were cited as the two most heavily patronised public libraries in the territory.

In 2000, management of the library was taken over by the newly formed Leisure and Cultural Services Department (LCSD) after the Regional Council was disbanded.

Description
The library occupies three floors of the Low Block of the Tsuen Wan Government Offices.

The library includes an adult library, children's library, reference library, multimedia library, newspapers and periodicals section, computer and information centre, students' study room, and extension activities room. In addition, it is home to two special collections: one on the history and culture of Tsuen Wan District, and another called the "Modern Living Collection" which includes resources on home design, domestic maintenance, and related subjects.

Expansion
The government is planning to renovate and expand the library. The proposal, estimated to cost HK$143.8 million, involves a renovation of the existing three library floors (3/F, 4/F, and 5/F) as well as the extension of the library into the 6/F and 7/F of the building. The latter floors are currently used as office and supporting space and are not open to the public. The Home Affairs Bureau sought the support of the Legislative Council for the project in 2021.

Gallery

References

External links
 

1993 establishments in Hong Kong
Libraries established in 1993
Public libraries in Hong Kong
Regional Council of Hong Kong
Tsuen Wan